The Scottish Parliament (Holyrood) has 73 constituencies, each electing one Member of the Scottish Parliament (MSP) by the plurality (first past the post) system of election, and eight additional members regions, each electing seven additional MSPs.

Each region is a group of constituencies, and the D'Hondt method of allocating additional member seats from party lists is used to produce a form of proportional representation for each region

The total number of parliamentary seats is 129. For links to lists of MSPs, see Member of the Scottish Parliament.

The constituencies and regions were first used in 1999, for the first election of the Scottish Parliament, and were used also for the 2003 and 2007 elections.

The First Periodic Review of Scottish Parliament Boundaries  by the Boundary Commission for Scotland was started in 2007, and the Commission reported to the Secretary of State for Scotland on 26 May 2010. The Commission's recommendations were implemented ahead of the 2011 Scottish Parliament election, to form the Scottish Parliament constituencies and regions from 2011.

Boundaries 

The Scottish Parliament constituencies from 1999 were created with the boundaries of the constituencies of the House of Commons of the Parliament of the United Kingdom (Westminster) as they were in 1999, apart from Orkney and Shetland, which are separate constituencies, unlike the single Orkney and Shetland Westminster constituency.

Under the Scotland Act 1998, changes to Westminster boundaries were also to be changes to Holyrood boundaries. This link between the two sets of constituencies was broken, however, by the Scottish Parliament (Constituencies) Act 2004,  before the results of the fifth periodical review of Westminster constituencies were implemented for the 2005 United Kingdom general election. The fifth Westminster review reduced the number of Westminster constituencies and, therefore, the number of Scottish Members of Parliament, from 72 to 59.

The boundaries of Westminster constituencies, as they existed until 2005, had not been subject to review since the removal of local government regions and districts. Many Holyrood constituencies, retaining those boundaries as they do, now straddle boundaries between the current council areas created in 1996. Newer Westminster constituencies also straddle council area boundaries but, in Westminster representation, there is a clear sense of council areas being grouped into larger areas: the East Ayrshire council area and South Ayrshire council area, for example, are treated as a single area.

Various council areas are divided between two Holyrood electoral regions. One council area, the South Lanarkshire council area, was divided between three different electoral regions.

The Arbuthnott Commission, in its final report, January 2006, recommended that council area boundaries and Holyrood and Westminster constituency boundaries should all be reviewed together. This recommendation has not been implemented.

Constituencies (first past the post seats)

Additional member regions

References

External links
Boundary Commission for Scotland Information Paper -  Scottish Parliament constituencies and regions: 1999-2011

 
Scottish Parliament
Scotland politics-related lists